Eugene T. Bagley  (June 7, 1861 – August 15, 1901) was a 19th-century professional baseball player. He played catcher and outfielder for the 1886 New York Giants.

External links

1861 births
1901 deaths
Major League Baseball catchers
New York Giants (NL) players
19th-century baseball players
Binghamton Crickets (1880s) players
Scranton Indians players
Baseball players from New York (state)
Burials at Calvary Cemetery (Queens)